Irving F. Greengo (February 9, 1925 – March 12, 2018) was an American politician and engineer in the state of Washington. He served the 47 district from 1975 to 1983.

References

1925 births
2018 deaths
Iowa Republicans
Washington (state) Republicans
Members of the Washington House of Representatives